Alejandro Salvador "Alex" Pagulayan (born June 25, 1978) is a Filipino-born Canadian professional pool player. His nickname is "the Lion", given to him by the great Cliff Thorburn, former World Snooker champion. Alex was born in Cabagan, Isabela, Philippines and was raised in Toronto, Ontario, Canada. In 2012, Pagulayan became a citizen of Canada and now resides in Toronto.

He is known for his relaxed demeanor during competition, and is a crowd favorite, well liked because of his humorous interaction with the audience and entertaining impressions of other players.

Early years
Alex Pagulayan was born in the town of Cabagan in Isabela, Philippines. He and his family emigrated to Canada when he was 13 years old. His father managed a pool hall, so Pagulayan was introduced to the game at an early age.  Though he was also attracted to other sports, he thought his physique may have been unsuitable for them.  He has said, "I like a lot of sports, but with pool, you don't have to be physically tough."  His main training venue was Loma's pool hall.

Professional career
Pagulayan has experience in the game of snooker other than Pool, helping the Filipino team to win the Snooker Gold Medal at the 2005 SEA Games (held in Manila, Philippines) with teammates Joven Alba and Leonardo Andam.  After the team's 3–2 win against Thailand at the Makati Coliseum, Pagulayan emerged as a triple gold medalist.

Pagulayan in the first rack of the semi-finals in the 2004 BCA Open, sank six balls on the break — two-thirds of the entire rack. Pagulayan's break did not include the 9 ball, and despite the six ball advantage, he lost that game (to fellow countryman Santos Sambajon).

In 2002, Pagulayan won through to the finals of the US Open Nine-ball Championship, but was defeated by Ralf Souquet, 11–13. Three years later, he had another good run the US Open Nine-ball Championship title and won it, defeating Jose Parica in the finals, 11–6.<ref>Pagulayan wins U.S. Open , '"AzBilliards.com. Retrieved June 18, 2007</ref>

In 2003, Pagulayan went on the road in the United States with Canadian pool player Ronnie Wiseman to compete in pocket billiard tournaments.  They scored a double victory at the Carolinas Open at Fast Eddie's in Goldsboro, North Carolina, with Wiseman winning the one-pocket tournament and Pagulayan winning the nine-ball event. Later in 2003, Pagulayan reached the finals of the World Nine-ball Championship but was beaten by Thorsten Hohmann 10–17.

In 2004 in Taipei, Taiwan, Pagulayan captured the prestigious WPA World Nine-ball Championship title while representing the Philippines. The score was a 17–13 victory over Pei-wei Chang in the final. This made him the second Filipino to become a world champion, after Efren Reyes.

In 2006, Pagulayan won the first national championship of the Billiards and Snooker Congress of Philippines (BSCP), besting Gandy Valle in the final and earning P1,000,000 (US$20,639).

Not many pool players in the Philippines excel at or even play straight pool. However, at a demonstration match at the 2006 Derby City Classic in Kentucky, Pagulayan made a high run of 130, the second-highest of the event. This made him the third known Filipino player to have run of 100 balls in straight pool competition.

In 2007, Pagulayan won the World Summit of Pool nine-ball championship held at the Riviera Casino in Las Vegas, Nevada.  American Shane Van Boening defeated Pagulayan earlier in the event, 11–4, but the veteran Pagulayan came back from the losing bracket of the double-elimination tournament chart by beating fellow countrymen Francisco Bustamante and Warren Kiamco, only to face Van Boening in the final round.  The semi-finals as well as the final matches were recorded by ESPN for future broadcast, and the final match between Pagulayan and Van Boening was a race to 7.  Pagulayan shot out with a strong lead, 4–1, but Van Boening managed to tie the score at 5–5.  However, after Pagulayan  him, resulting in a loss of game for Van Boening, Pagulayan advanced and captured the title in the final game, ending the match at 7–5.Shane Van Boening vs. Alex Pagulayan Live Update , TheActionReport.com. Retrieved June 18, 2007

On May 11, 2008, Pagulayan defeated Mika Immonen in the Matchroom Sports production of the World Pool Masters in a thrilling final match held at the Rivera Hotel and Casino in Las Vegas, Nevada.  In the race to 8, Immonen maintained a strong lead against Pagulayan with a score of 6 to 3, but due to an illegal break when he failed to send the required number of balls past the headstring, Pagulayan took advantage of this error by winning the next three games in a row, with the eventual title going to Pagulayan. "I feel like I did when I won the World Championship," said Pagulayan flexing his biceps and performing a running man dance for the cameras directly after sinking the 9 ball for the match win.  "I think I've finished in every place here except first," he said. Pagulayan was a finalist in the 2006 World Pool Masters, but lost to German Ralf Souquet.

"The Lion" Pagulayan beat Joven Bustamante on June 15, 2008, to win the P 300,000-Magnificent 7 Winner-Take-All 9-Ball Invitational second qualifier in Mandaue City, Cebu for the December grand final. He was set for the June, 2nd leg of the Sen. Manuel Villar Cup in Cebu City.

Alex Pagulayan, 30, received the $15,000 check, as he defeated Dennis Orcollo, 11–6, to win the 4th leg of the Guinness 9-Ball Tour  at the Velocity at Novena Square, Singapore. Pagulayan beat the 2005 world title winner, Wu Chia Ching, 9–6, while Orcollo defeated Yang Ching-Shun, 9–8. Orcollo settled for the runner-up purse of $6,000.

In 2011, Alex Pagulayan defeated Floyd Ziegler 6–0 to win the final of the 2011 Canadian Amateur Snooker Championship, in his return to competitive snooker, he successfully defended the title in 2012 and became a Canadian citizen.

In 2014, Pagulayan entered the Snooker Q School in order to qualify for main tour events. He participated in qualifying for the 2014 Wuxi Classic, but lost his match to world number 14 Stephen Maguire. Days later he took part in the qualifying for the next ranking event on the Snooker tour, the Australian Goldfields Open, but lost the first qualifying round 5–1 to Ian Burns. In qualifying for the next ranking event, the Shanghai Masters, he lost to John Astley.

In 2016, Pagulayan was crowned champion of the 2016 9-Ball Canadian Pool Championships held in Quebec, Canada after he tumbled John Morra in the championship match, 15–6. Pagulayan would remain undefeated in all of his matches, including a semifinals victory over Alain Martel in the tournament.

He also won the 2017 CSI U.S Open 8-Ball Championship against Shane Van Boening.

Lawsuit
Pagulayan filed a libel and P 6 million damages action with Pasig Regional Trial Court on July 14, 2008. He sued Yen Makabenta and Ernesto Fajardo, the officials of the Billiards and Snookers Congress of the Philippines (BSCP) who had accused him of "sharking" (distracting his opponent to win, at the Singapore leg Guinness 9-Ball Tour), in addition to being a "disgraceful loser" and a "liar".

Switch to Canada
In 2012 Pagulayan began representing Canada in international competitions. His agent reportedly said during the 2012 World Cup of Pool that Pagulayan encountered fewer "political obstacles" in representing Canada while the pool player himself said that he switched to representing Canada due to competition with other Filipino players. He made the move in order to continue his professional career, which he stated was his livelihood. At the 2012 World Cup of Pool, he, along with partner John Morra, finished in the Round of 16, and was eliminated by Filipino pair Francisco Bustamante and Efren Reyes.

Personal life
Despite his 2004 relocation to the Philippines, Pagulayan still officially has a mailing address in Canada.  In March 2007, when asked where he resides in a Pool Billiards News'' interview, Pagulayan jokingly replied, "My suitcase. Yes. That's where I live right now – out of my suitcase."

Aside from pool, Alex also plays poker, chess and basketball, and is friends with poker star Daniel Negreanu. He is a big fan of the band Texas.

Titles and achievements

References

External links
WorldPoolMasters Biography
Snooker Gold Medal
Pagulayan champ
Alex Pagulayan Profile
Lion Bared
Alex Pagulayan interview on Xtrem Pressbox

Canadian pool players
1978 births
People from Isabela (province)
Canadian sportspeople of Filipino descent
Filipino emigrants to Canada
Naturalized citizens of Canada
Filipino pool players
Living people
Trick shot artists
World champions in pool
Canadian snooker players
Southeast Asian Games gold medalists for the Philippines
Southeast Asian Games medalists in cue sports
WPA World Nine-ball Champions
Competitors at the 2005 Southeast Asian Games